The 2019 Laurence Olivier Awards was held on 7 April 2019 at the Royal Albert Hall. The ceremony was hosted by Jason Manford.

Eligibility
Any new production that opened between 22 February 2018 and 19 February 2019 in a theatre represented in the membership of the Society of London Theatre is eligible for consideration, provided it has performed at least 30 performances.

Event calendar
1 March: Matthew Bourne announced as the recipient of the Society Special Award
4 March: Jason Manford announced as host
5 March: Nominations announced by Sheila Atim and Giles Terera
7 April: Award ceremony held

Winners and nominees
The nominations were announced on 5 March 2019 in 26 categories.

Productions with multiple wins and nominations

Multiple wins 
The following 4 productions received multiple awards:

 4: Come from Away,  Company, The Inheritance
 2: Summer and Smoke

Multiple nominations
The following 19 productions received multiple nominations:

9: Come from Away, Company
8: The Inheritance
6: The King and I
5: Home, I'm Darling, The Lehman Trilogy, Six, Summer and Smoke
3: A Monster Calls, Caroline, or Change, Fun Home, The Price, Tina
2: All about Eve, King Lear, The Lieutenant of Inishmore, Misty, Nine Night, Quiz

See also
73rd Tony Awards

References

External links
Olivier Awards official website

2019 theatre awards
2019 awards in the United Kingdom
Laurence Olivier Awards ceremonies
April 2019 events in the United Kingdom
2019 in London
Events at the Royal Albert Hall